Aleksandr Mitrofanovich Levin Александр Митрофанович Левин (15 May 1871 – May 1929) was a Russian chess master.

He twice shared 1st with Mikhail Chigorin in St. Petersburg in 1900 and 1902. He tied for 11-12th at Hannover 1902 (the 13th DSB Congress, Dawid Janowski won).

References

1871 births
1929 deaths
Russian Jews
Russian chess players
Jewish chess players